The Hon. William Brodrick (14 February 1763 – 29 April 1819) was a British Member of Parliament and Government official.

He was born the 5th son of George Brodrick, 3rd Viscount Midleton and younger brother of George Brodrick, 4th Viscount Midleton. He was educated at Eton College (1775–1780), St. John’s College, Cambridge (1780–1783) and Lincoln's Inn (1782).

He was appointed Secretary to the Board of Control from 1793 to 1803, which involved serving as the chief official in London responsible for Indian affairs. He succeeded his brother George as MP for Whitchurch, sitting from 1796 to 1818 in both the Parliament of Great Britain and then the Parliament of the United Kingdom. In the administration of Henry Addington he served as one of the Lords Commissioners of the Treasury from 1802 to 1803.

He was married to Mary Preston of County Meath but died childless of failing health in Nice.

References

|-

1763 births
1819 deaths
People educated at Eton College
Alumni of St John's College, Cambridge
Members of Lincoln's Inn
Younger sons of viscounts
Members of the Parliament of Great Britain for English constituencies
British MPs 1796–1800
Members of the Parliament of the United Kingdom for English constituencies
UK MPs 1801–1802
UK MPs 1802–1806
UK MPs 1806–1807
UK MPs 1807–1812
UK MPs 1812–1818